The National Eating Disorders Association (NEDA) is an American non-profit organization devoted to preventing eating disorders, providing treatment referrals, and increasing the education and understanding of eating disorders, weight, and body image. The National Eating Disorders Association organizes and sponsors National Eating Disorders Week. Also known as NEDAwareness Week, it takes place during the last week of February, and is "a collective effort of primarily volunteers, including eating disorder professionals, health care providers, students, educators, social workers, and individuals committed to raising awareness of the dangers surrounding eating disorders and the need for early intervention and treatment."

History
In 2001, Eating Disorders Awareness & Prevention and the American Anorexia Bulimia Association merged to form the National Eating Disorders Association. At the time, Eating Disorders Awareness & Prevention and the American Anorexia Bulimia Association were "the largest and longest standing eating disorders prevention and advocacy organizations in the world".

About NEDA
According to their website, the National Eating Disorders Association "supports individuals and families affected by eating disorders, and serves as a catalyst for prevention, cures and access to quality care." More specifically, they "campaign for prevention, improved access to quality treatment, and increased research funding to better understand and treat eating disorders," and "work with partners and volunteers to develop programs and tools to help everyone who seeks assistance."

In 2012, the National Eating Disorders Association launched a website called Proud2BMe. It is a website for teens and all of its efforts are done "with the goal of promoting positive body image and encouraging healthy attitudes about food and weight". This fits with the National Eating Disorders Association's overall mission.

Resources
They have a website and national toll-free helpline which can both help "families, friends and individuals find appropriate treatment". Also available Monday to Friday from 9:00 a.m. to 5:00 p.m. is a national toll-free National Eating Disorders Association Helpline for individuals seeking treatment at (800) 931-2237 

The National Eating Disorders Association also has a wide range of resources and information available for free for men and women, and family and friends of those with an eating disorder. This includes pertinent terms and definitions, warning signs, and various means of preventing eating disorders.

According to researcher Ben Radford who wrote in Skeptical Inquirer "I found many examples of flawed, misleading, and sometimes completely wrong information and data being copied and widely disseminated among eating disorder organizations and educators without anyone bothering to consult the original research to verify its accuracy". Radford states that miss-leading statistics and data have been ignored by organizations like the National Eating Disorder Association who has not released data for "incidence of anorexia from 1984-2017" he states that each agency continues to report incorrect numbers assuming that someone else has checked the accuracy.

Activities
The National Eating Disorders Association holds various Walks throughout the United States at different times during the year. The Walks are fundraising events that also serve the purpose of "uniting communities and raising awareness about eating disorders. They are non-competitive events, which allow registrants to participate in whatever capacity they feel is appropriate for them."

They also hold an annual conference, and on their website, they state that, "families, people in recovery and professionals meet together to learn at our conferences."

The National Eating Disorders Association is also responsible for the Media Watchdog program, which "brings students, educators, health professionals, parents, eating disorders sufferers, and concerned consumers together to encourage companies and advertisers to send healthy media messages regarding body size and shape." The group consists of volunteers who "monitor various forms of media, commending or critiquing advertisements or programs that positively or negatively impact body image and self-concept." They then "send notices of ads or programs worthy of praise or protest to the National Eating Disorders Association office." As the National Eating Disorders Association says, "It is NEDA's hope that by reaching out to the leaders of corporations we can educate, inform and build relationships that will lead to lasting changes in advertising."

Eating disorders
Eating disorders are "mental health diseases that have recognizable causes, clear symptoms, and predictable outcomes". As Kramer notes, "They also respond to treatment." The Alliance for Eating Disorders Awareness further states that, "Eating disorders involve serious disturbances in eating behavior, such as extreme and unhealthy reduction of food intake or severe overeating, as well as feelings of distress or extreme concern about body shape or weight."

As many cases go unreported, it is difficult to estimate how many people in the United States have eating disorders. The National Association of Anorexia Nervosa and Associated Eating Disorders (ANAD) and the -03-28|df= report that anywhere between 7 and 10 million women, and 1 million men have anorexia nervosa or bulimia; millions more have binge-eating disorder. ANAD points out that, "All segments of society are affected: Men and women, young and old, rich and poor, all ethnicities, [and] all socio-economic levels." "The American College of Physicians lists eating disorders as one of the nine most serious problems affecting adolescents and young adults, and anorexia nervosa…as the third most common chronic illness."

In addition, "individuals with eating disorders have the highest mortality rate among any groups affected with mental illness as 20% of people with eating disorders die prematurely from complications related to their eating disorder, including suicide and heart problems." DeBate et al. go on to note that, "anorexia nervosa has the highest mortality rate of any mental illness".

Four main types of eating disorders
Anorexia is "self-imposed starvation and occurs when someone avoids food to the point that he or she is 15 percent or more below a healthy body weight".
Bulimia is "a disorder in which someone binges and then purges". As Cassell and Gleaves note, "the most frustrating part of the disorder may be that he or she binge eats even when not hungry". Purging is "a way of counteracting overeating", and can include "vomiting, excessive exercising, fasting, and/or taking laxatives".
Binge-eating disorder involves regular binge eating, but not purging. Many people with this disorder "cycle between dieting and binging", and "they may or may not be overweight".
Eating disorders not otherwise specified occur when "people...have variations of disordered eating, yet, they cannot meet full diagnostic criteria for Anorexia and/or Bulimia". Warning signs may include "for females, all of the criteria for Anorexia Nervosa are met except that the individual has regular menses", and "repeatedly chewing and spitting out, but not swallowing, large amounts of food".

Consequences
As Kramer says, "All of these eating disorders are serious mental health problems that should not be ignored. They can and sometimes do cause death." The Academy for Eating Disorders (AED) states that, "Eating disorders can have a profoundly negative impact on an individual's quality of life. Self-image, interpersonal relationships, financial status, and job performance are often negatively affected." They go on to say that, "Semi-starvation in anorexia nervosa can affect most organ systems," and anorexia causes "anemia, kidney dysfunction, cardiovascular problems, changes in brain structure, and osteoporosis."

The Academy for Eating Disorders further notes that the, "Self-induced vomiting seen in both anorexia nervosa and bulimia nervosa can lead to swelling of salivary glands, electrolyte and mineral disturbances, and dental enamel erosion." In addition, "rarer complications" include "tearing [of] the esophagus, rupturing of the stomach, and life-threatening irregularities of the heart rhythm."

Possible causes
According to Cassell and Gleaves, "biological, psychological, [and] social factors" all play a role in the development of an eating disorder. In their Introduction, they note that, "In addition to core eating and body image-related psychopathology of the eating disorder...a variety of additional problems, including depression, anxiety, obsessive-compulsive behavior, post-traumatic stress disorder, and substance abuse" could all play a role in the development of an eating disorder. "Interpersonal and family problems as well as personality disorders are also common." The Mayo Clinic also notes that people with eating disorders may have "low self-esteem, perfectionism, impulsive behavior, [and] anger management difficulties."

Society
Cassell and Gleaves also point out that, "Society is currently preoccupied with thinness, dieting, beauty and health, and a great industry has arisen to take advantage of the fear of fatness that has spread through developed nations and is beginning to spread throughout others".

Family
In addition, Taylor et al. did a retrospective study of "455 college women with high weight and shape concerns, who participated in an Internet-based eating disorder prevention program". They assessed "perceived family negative comments about weight, shape, and eating; social adjustment; social support; self-esteem; and childhood abuse and neglect".

They found that "More than 80% of the sample reported some parental or sibling negative comments about their weight and shape or eating". In addition, "On subscales of emotional abuse and neglect, most participants scored above the median, and nearly one third scored above the 90th percentile". Their study "provides additional evidence that family criticism results in long-lasting, negative effects".

Biology
Gupta and Abedin write that, "Dr. Walter Kaye, a board member of the National Eating Disorders Association…cautions that eating disorders are much more complicated than researchers first thought...the disorders can't be blamed solely on environmental factors. Brain-scan studies show that the neural circuitry that normally responds to the pleasurable, rewarding aspects of eating doesn't seem to work in anorexics".

Prevention
As stated in the above section, parents and their comments play an important role in how their children see themselves. Gupta and Abedin caution parents to, "Be aware of what signals you might be giving your children when you talk about your own desire to lose weight. Pay attention to the stereotypical body image your kids are watching on TV. And perhaps most important, talk with them about it."

The Mayo Clinic also suggests that parents should "enlist [their] child's doctor's help...encourage healthy-eating habits...keep an eye on computer use...cultivate and reinforce a healthy body image...and reach out if you suspect trouble."

Diagnosis
Sim, et al. note that, while, "primary care physicians may find it uniquely challenging to detect eating disorders in their early stages, before obvious physical problems arise and while psychological
symptoms are subtle...the physician is an integral member of the treatment team and is in a unique role to diagnose and treat eating disorders."

In initially diagnosing an eating disorder, the SCOFF can be used as a screening measure. It consists of five questions and takes less than two minutes to complete. The questions assess "the core psychopathology of AN and BN in early stages of the disorders," and "The SCOFF has been found to have high sensitivity and specificity for AN and BN." It includes the following questions:

Do you make yourself sick because you feel uncomfortably full?
Do you worry you have lost control over how much you eat?
Do you believe yourself to be fat when others say you are too thin?
Have you recently lost more than fourteen pounds in a 3-month period?
Would you say that food dominates your life?

While "2 or more affirmative answers warrant further investigation for an eating disorder, it is wise to gather more information about eating disorder symptoms if any of these items are endorsed, particularly because substantial weight loss or self-induced vomiting alone should be sufficient to prompt further inquiry."

Anorexia
Sim, et al. write that, "Practice guidelines for the treatment of AN recommend a multidisciplinary approach involving medical management, nutritional intervention, and psychotherapy."

Bulimia
Sim, et al. also note that, "The most effective treatments emerging for patients with BN include a specific type of psychotherapy, cognitive behavioral therapy (CBT), that focuses on modifying the specific behaviors and ways of thinking that maintain the binge-eating and purging behaviors."

Further treatment
Additional treatment might include inpatient treatment, partial hospitalization, and drug therapy. Various types of therapy (including cognitive-behavioral therapy, interpersonal psychotherapy, and family therapy) may also be helpful. Meeting with a nutritionist may be recommended.

Eating disorders in the news

October 2008
In 2008, a "measure boosting insurance coverage for mental illness and treatment of drug and alcohol addiction secured final U.S. congressional passage…as part of financial industry bailout legislation." The bill requires "health insurers to give the same level of coverage for mental illness and substance abuse treatment as other ailments." It also "bars insurers from charging higher deductibles, co-payments, coinsurance or out-of-pocket expenses, or imposing limits including frequency of treatment, number of visits and days of coverage for mental health and addiction care."

However, as Dunham points out, "The bill will not force health plan providers to give mental health coverage but will make those that offer benefits for mental illness and substance addiction treatment…do so on the same terms as medical and surgical care." In addition, "It would apply to group health plans covering more than 50 people."

March 2011
A recent study "billed as the largest and most comprehensive analysis of eating disorders" examined data on "more than 10,000 teens aged 13 to 18. Binge eating disorder was the most common, affecting more than 1.5 percent of kids studied", and "just under 1 percent had experienced bulimia, and 0.3 percent had had anorexia."

In addition, they found that "more than half the affected teens had depression, anxiety or some other mental disorder. Sizeable numbers also reported suicide thoughts or attempts."

See also
Eating Disorders Coalition
Families Empowered and Supporting Treatment of Eating Disorders (F.E.A.S.T.)

References

Further reading
Cassell, Dana K., and David H. Gleaves. Foreword. The Encyclopedia of Obesity and Eating Disorders. 3rd edition. New York: Infobase, 2006. .
Costin, Carolyn. The Eating Disorder Sourcebook. 3rd edition. New York: McGraw-Hill, 2007. .
DeBate, Rita, Heather Blunt, and Marion Ann Becker. "Eating Disorders." Ed. Bruce Lubotsky Levin and Marion Ann Becker. A Public Health Perspective of Women's Mental Health. New York: Springer, 2010. .
Garner, David M., and Paul E. Garfinkel, eds. Handbook of Treatment for Eating Disorders. 2nd edition. New York: Guilford, 1997. .
Kramer, Gerri Freid. The Truth About Eating Disorders. 2nd edition. New York: Infobase, 2009. .

External links

Eating disorders - MayoClinic.com

Eating disorder organizations
Mental health organizations in New York (state)